Rhamphomyia biserialis is a species of dance flies, in the fly family Empididae.

References

Rhamphomyia
Asilomorph flies of Europe
Insects described in 1910